Chaenactis evermannii is a North American species of flowering plants in the aster family known by the common name Evermann's pincushion. It is found only at high altitudes in the mountains in the central part of the US State of Idaho.

Description
Chaenactis evermannii is a small perennial rarely more than 12 cm (5 inches) tall. Each branch produces 1-3 flower heads each containing disc florets but no ray florets. It grows in subalpine, usually decomposing, granitic sand or gravel slopes, ridges, scree, talus, or above conifer forests.

The species is named for American ichthyologist Barton Warren Evermann (1853–1932).

References

evermannii
Flora of Idaho
Endemic flora of the United States
Plants described in 1912
Taxa named by Edward Lee Greene
Flora without expected TNC conservation status